Kurg is an Estonian surname meaning "crane" (genus Grus). As of 1 January 2022, there were 649 people with the surname in Estonia: 311 men and 338 women. Kurg is ranked as the 139th most common surname for men in Estonian and 139th for women. The surname Kurg is most common in Põlva County, where 18.40 per 10,000 inhabitants of the county bear the name.

People bearing the surname Kurg include:
Ants Kurg (born 1962), biochemist (:et)
Friedrich Kurg (1898–1945), military major and partisan
Henn-Ants Kurg (1898–1943), military colonel and diplomat
 (1922–2003), Baptist clergyman and soldier
 (born 1955), Baptist clergyman, theologian, and publisher
 (1961–2005), motorcross racer and motorsport activist
Kalle Kurg (born 1942), poet, writer, critic, translator and editor
Kustav Aleksander Kurg (1902–1992), politician
 (born 1980), rugby player and sportsman
 (born 1979), artist
Õnne Kurg (born 1973), cross-country skier
Vambola Kurg (1898–1981), actor

References

Estonian-language surnames